Hemingway Corner was a Canadian-American folk pop group, active in the 1990s.

Biography
The group was formed in 1992 by two established singer-songwriters, David Martin and Johnny Douglas. Martin, from Atlanta, Georgia, was a musician and songwriter who lived in Nashville before moving to Los Angeles.  Douglas, from Toronto, Ontario, was working as a session songwriter in Nashville. The two met while writing songs for Sony Music and released their self-titled debut album in 1993.  They had hits on the Canadian pop charts with "Man on a Mission" and "Love, Love, Love", and received a Juno Award nomination for Best New Group in 1996.  Choosing to return to his independent songwriting work, Douglas left the band the following year and later started another band called Beat Prophets.

While working on a Neil Young tribute album, Borrowed Tunes, the Skydiggers introduced Martin to Scott Dibble (from the Toronto band Watertown) and Mark Sterling from Edmonton. They recorded a cover of "Tell Me Why" for the tribute album as a newly revamped Hemingway Corner.  With some material already written by Dibble and Sterling, the band released a follow-up album, Under the Big Sky in 1995. The band initially supported the album by touring as an opening act for Jann Arden in 1995, during which Dibble would also perform as the duet vocalist on Arden's hit "Unloved". Three more singles, "Big Sky", "Tell Me Why" and "Watch Over You", were successful on the charts before the band dissolved in late 1996. "Watch Over You" received a SOCAN Award in 1997 as one of the ten most-played Canadian songs on radio that year.

They reunited in 2010 to record the album Speed of Life.

Martin is still an active songwriter, having penned tunes for Edwin, including co-writing the hit "Alive" from Edwin's debut Another Spin Around the Sun, playing on the follow-up album Edwin & the Pressure, and writing for country singer Tara Lyn Hart.

Mark Sterling is also actively songwriting, having released three solo albums including his self-titled debut (1996), The Well (1999) and Take From It What You Need (2009). He also worked with young country singer Adam Gregory for his debut album The Way I'm Made.

Discography

Albums

Singles

References

Musical groups established in 1992
Musical groups disestablished in 1996
Musical groups from Toronto
Canadian country music groups
Canadian folk rock groups
Canadian musical duos
1992 establishments in Ontario
1996 disestablishments in Ontario